Rose China Town (Chinese: 玫瑰中國城站; Pinyin: Méiguī zhōngguó chéng zhàn) is a light rail station of the Ankeng light rail, operated by the New Taipei Metro, in Xindian, New Taipei, Taiwan.

Station overview
The station is an elevated station with an island platform. It is located on Section 3, Anyi Road, near its intersection with Meigui Road.

Station layout

Around the station
 Zhongyang Park
 Rose China Town

Bus connections
Buses 648 and 909 stop at this station.

History
Construction of the station started in 2014 and finished in 2022. The station opened on February 10, 2023.

See also
 Ankeng light rail
 New Taipei Metro
 Rail transport in Taiwan

References

External links
 New Taipei Metro Corporation
 New Taipei City Department of Rapid Transit
Ankeng light rail stations